Ransart may refer to:
 Ransart, Belgium, a former Belgian municipality and now part of the city of Charleroi
 Ransart, Pas-de-Calais, a commune in the Pas-de-Calais department in France